The Harakmbut (Arakmbut, Harakmbet) are indigenous people in Peru. 
They speak the Harakmbut language. An estimated 2,000 Harakmbut people live in the Madre de Dios Region near the Brazilian border in the Peruvian Amazon.

Amarakaeri

Amarakaeri are also called Amaracaire or Amarakaire people. Subgroups of their tribe include the Kochimberi, Küpondirideri, Wíntaperi, Wakitaneri, and Kareneri peoples. As of 1987, 500 Amarakaeri people lived near the Madre de Dios and Colorado Rivers. Some pan for gold as a means of subsistence.

Huachipaeri
Huachipaeri are also known as Huachipaire or Wacipaire people. As of 2000, there were 310 Huachipaeri living near the upper Madre de Dios and Keros Rivers. Subgroups of the Huachipaeri including the following, with population figures from 2000:

 Arasairi, population 20
 Manuquiari, population 50
 Puikiri (Puncuri), population 36–50
 Sapiteri, population 12
 Toyeri, population 10

All the subgroups speak dialects of the Huachipaeri language.

History
When the Harakmbut were first contacted by members of the Dominican Order in 1940, they numbered 30,000.

Notable Harakmbut people
Q'orianka Kilcher (b. 1990), American actress of Huachipaeri and Quechua descent on her father's side

See also

Amarakaeri Communal Reserve

Notes

Indigenous peoples of the Amazon
Indigenous peoples in Peru